Laurence Wyke (born 20 September 1996) is an English footballer who currently plays for Major League Soccer side Nashville SC.

Career
Wyke spent time in the Manchester United academy whilst growing before heading to America to study and play college soccer at Trinity University and Furman University. On 20 February 2019, Wyke joined USL Championship side Atlanta United 2.

Following a successful first team debut against Nashville SC in the first game of the season, Wyke was promoted to Atlanta United FC on 5 March 2020. He appeared in 7 MLS matches in the 2020 season before being released at the end of the year. In March 2021, Wyke joined Tampa Bay Rowdies ahead of the 2021 season. During his debut season with the club, Wyke was primarily utilized in the midfield, but was moved to the defensive line in 2022.

In October 2022, Wyke was fined and given a 12-game suspension following the USL Championship’s investigation into allegations of racially discriminatory behavior following the October 2nd match between Monterey Bay FC and the Tampa Bay Rowdies. Following an appeal by the Rowdies, Wyke's suspension was overturned by the USL's Independent Disciplinary Council. He was released by Tampa following their 2022 season.

On 22 December 2022, it was announced that Wyke had signed with Major League Soccer side Nashville SC for the upcoming 2023 season.

Career statistics

Club

References

External links
Laurence Wyke at Trinity University
Laurence Wyke at Furman University
Laurence Wyke at USL Championship

1996 births
Living people
Footballers from Bolton
Trinity Tigers men's soccer players
Furman Paladins men's soccer players
Atlanta United 2 players
Atlanta United FC players
Tampa Bay Rowdies players
Nashville SC players
USL Championship players
Major League Soccer players
English footballers
Association football midfielders
English expatriate footballers
English expatriate sportspeople in the United States